The Nauruan passport is an international travel document that is issued to citizens of  Nauru.

As of 1 January 2017, Nauruan citizens had visa-free or visa on arrival access to 80 countries and territories, ranking the Nauruan passport 60th in terms of travel freedom (tied with Kuwaiti and Maldivian passports) according to the Henley visa restrictions index.

See also
Visa requirements for Nauruan citizens

References

Passports by country
Foreign relations of Nauru